Angleton is a city in and the county seat of Brazoria County, Texas, United States, within the Houston–The Woodlands–Sugar Land metropolitan area. Angleton lies at the intersection of State Highway 288, State Highway 35, and the Union Pacific Railroad. The population was 19,429 at the 2020 census. Angleton is in the 14th congressional district, and is represented by Republican Congressman Randy Weber.

History
Angleton was founded in 1890 near the center of Brazoria County and named for the wife of the general manager of the Velasco Terminal Railway. A bitter rivalry emerged between the town and nearby Brazoria for the location of the county seat; Angleton was chosen as the seat in 1896 and rechosen by county-wide election in 1913. The town was incorporated on November 12, 1912.

Geography

Angleton is located near the center of Brazoria County. The town is located about seven miles north of Lake Jackson and is about 20 miles away from the Gulf of Mexico coastline.

Climate
The climate in this area is characterized by hot, humid summers and generally cold to cool winters.  According to the Köppen climate classification system, Angleton has a humid subtropical climate, Cfa on climate maps.

Demographics

As of the 2020 United States census, there were 19,429 people, 7,779 households, and 5,178 families residing in the city.

As of the census of 2000, 18,130 people, 6,508 households, and 4,894 families resided in the city. The population density was 1,716.3 people per square mile (662.9/km2). There were 7,220 housing units at an average density of 683.5 per square mile (264.0/km2). The racial makeup of the city was 63.21% White, 23.19% Hispanic or Latino, 11.38% African American, 0.47% Native American, 1.12% Asian, 0.04% Pacific Islander, 9.63% from other races, and 2.15% from two or more races.

Of the 6,508 households, 41.0% had children under the age of 18 living with them, 56.5% were married couples living together, 13.9% had a female householder with no husband present, and 24.8% were not families. About 21.2% of all households were made up of individuals, and 8.7% had someone living alone who was 65 years of age or older. The average household size was 2.75 and the average family size was 3.19.

In the city, the population was distributed as 29.8% under the age of 18, 9.0% from 18 to 24, 30.3% from 25 to 44, 20.1% from 45 to 64, and 10.8% who were 65 years of age or older. The median age was 33 years. For every 100 females, there were 94.0 males. For every 100 females age 18 and over, there were 88.9 males.

The median income for a household in the city was $42,184, and for a family was $50,019. Males had a median income of $39,711 versus $23,508 for females. The per capita income for the city was $17,915. About 8.9% of families and 11.1% of the population were below the poverty line, including 14.4% of those under age 18 and 13.8% of those age 65 or over.

Economy
Benchmark Electronics is based in Angleton. Country Hearth Inn, originally known as Homeplace, opened its first location in Angleton in 1983.

The Texas Department of Criminal Justice (TDCJ) operates the Angleton District Parole Office in Angleton. In addition, the TDCJ Retrieve Unit (later Wayne Scott Unit) was formerly located in an unincorporated area near Angleton. The main prison closed in 2020.

Arts and culture

Angleton hosts the Brazoria County Fair every October; it is Texas's largest county fair.

The Angleton Library and the Brazoria County Historical Museum Library are a part of the Brazoria County Library System.

Parks and recreation
Angleton is home to eight parks.
 Bates Park
 Brushy Bayou Park
 Dickey Park
 Freedom Park 
 Lakeside Park
 Masterson Park
 B. G. Peck Soccer Complex and Park
 Veterans Park

Education

Public schools
The public schools in the city are operated by Angleton Independent School District.

High schools
Angleton High School (Grades 9–12)

Junior high schools
Angleton Junior High School (Grades 6–8)

Elementary schools
Central Elementary (Grades PK–5)
Frontier Elementary (Grades K–5)
Northside Elementary (Grades PK–5)
Rancho Isabella Elementary (Grades K–5)
Southside Elementary (Grades K–5)
Westside Elementary (Grades K–5)

Alternative instructional

Angleton High School - ACE (Grades 9–12)
Brazoria County Juvenile Detention (Grades 5–12)
Brazoria County Alternative Education Center (Grades 3–12)
Student Alternative Center (DAEP Grades 1–12)

Private schools

 Angleton Christian School

Colleges and universities

The Texas Legislature designated portions of Angleton ISD that by September 1, 1995 had not been annexed by Alvin Community College as in the Brazosport College zone. As Angleton is not in the maps of Alvin CC, it is in the Brazosport College zone.

Media
Brazosport Facts is based in nearby Clute and the Houston Chronicle is based in Houston.

Angleton Times operated until 2004. Five employees were hired by The Facts, which also acquired the former newspaper's reader list.

Infrastructure

Transportation
Texas State Highway 288, a four-lane freeway, runs along the western edge of the city, with access from five exits. Highway 288 leads north  to downtown Houston and south  to Freeport near the Gulf of Mexico. Texas State Highway 35 crosses Highway 288 and passes through the center of Angleton, leading northeast  to Alvin and west  to Bay City.

Greyhound Bus Lines operates the Angleton Station at 530 E Mulberry St, located in the city. Locally, Southern Brazoria County Transit provides bus service options for Angleton, along with Clute, Lake Jackson, and Freeport.

Angleton has no passenger rail service, though Union Pacific Railroad operates nearly all of the freight railroads through the city. Angleton is the site of a three-way junction of Union Pacific service.

Angleton's closest airport is Texas Gulf Coast Regional Airport, though the airport is exclusive to general aviation and has no regularly scheduled commercial service. Angleton's primary thruway for commercial air service is through Houston-area airports, with Houston Hobby Airport being the closest, though George Bush Intercontinental Airport being the closest for most international flights.

Emergency services
Emergency services include Angleton Police Department, Angleton Area Emergency Medical Corps, and Angleton Volunteer Fire Department.

Notable people
 Dennis Bonnen, Republican member of Texas House of Representatives from District 25 from 1997 to 2021; born in Angleton in 1972
 Greg Bonnen, Republican member of Texas House from District 24 in Galveston County; born in Angleton in 1966, brother of Dennis Bonnen
 Quandre Diggs, cornerback for the Detroit Lions and safety for the Seattle Seahawks
 Gilbert Gardner, linebacker for Colts
 Ron Givens, first African-American Republican in Texas House of Representatives, represented Lubbock County from 1985 to 1989; thereafter taught school in Angleton prior to 1995
 Ahmard Hall, fullback for Tennessee Titans
 Quentin Jammer, cornerback for NFL's San Diego Chargers, Denver Broncos
 John Stockwell, CIA officer 
 Rodney Terry, basketball head coach, Fresno State
 Emmitt Thomas, Hall of Fame cornerback for Kansas City Chiefs
 Keith Toston, running back for St. Louis Rams
 Cody Vasut, Republican member of Texas House of Representatives from District 25 since 2021
 Ray Willis, offensive tackle for Seattle Seahawks

References

External links

 City of Angleton official website
 

Cities in Brazoria County, Texas
Cities in Texas
County seats in Texas
Greater Houston
Angleton, Texas